The 2021 Nottingham Open (also known as the Viking Open Nottingham for sponsorship purposes) was a professional tennis tournament played on outdoor grass courts. It was the 13th edition of the event for women and the 25th edition for men. It was classified as a WTA 250 on the 2021 WTA Tour for the women, and as an ATP Challenger Tour event for the men. The event took place at the Nottingham Tennis Centre in Nottingham, United Kingdom from 6 through 13 June 2021.

Champions

Men's singles

  Frances Tiafoe def.  Denis Kudla 6–1, 6–3.

Women's singles

  Johanna Konta def.  Zhang Shuai 6–2, 6–1

Men's doubles

  Matt Reid /  Ken Skupski def.  Matthew Ebden /  John-Patrick Smith 4–6, 7–5, [10–6].

Women's doubles

  Lyudmyla Kichenok /  Makoto Ninomiya def.  Caroline Dolehide /  Storm Sanders, 6–4, 6–7(3–7), [10–8]

ATP singles main-draw entrants

Seeds

 1 Rankings are as of 31 May 2021.

Other entrants
The following players received wildcards into the main draw:
  Jay Clarke
  Dan Evans
  Ryan Peniston

The following players received entry from the qualifying draw:
  Marius Copil
  Matthew Ebden
  Borna Gojo
  Aleksandar Vukic

WTA singles main-draw entrants

Seeds

 1 Rankings are as of 31 May 2021.

Other entrants
The following players received wildcards into the main draw:
  Katie Boulter
  Jodie Burrage
  Francesca Jones
  Emma Raducanu

The following players received entry from the qualifying draw:
  Sarah Beth Grey
  Kateryna Kozlova
  Tara Moore
  Lesley Pattinama Kerkhove
  Ankita Raina
  Eden Silva
  CoCo Vandeweghe
  Katie Volynets

The following players received entry as lucky losers:
  Martina Di Giuseppe
  Georgina García Pérez
  Marina Melnikova

Withdrawals
Before the tournament
  Paula Badosa → replaced by  Kurumi Nara
  Belinda Bencic → replaced by  Caty McNally
  Danielle Collins → replaced by  Marina Melnikova
  Misaki Doi → replaced by  Kristie Ahn
  Camila Giorgi → replaced by  Martina Di Giuseppe
  Polona Hercog → replaced by  Georgina García Pérez
  Hsieh Su-wei → replaced by  Arina Rodionova
  Marta Kostyuk → replaced by  Wang Yafan
  Ann Li → replaced by  Viktoriya Tomova
  Magda Linette → replaced by  María Camila Osorio Serrano
  Jessica Pegula → replaced by  Wang Xiyu
  Kristýna Plíšková → replaced by  Maddison Inglis
  Yulia Putintseva → replaced by  Harriet Dart
  Shelby Rogers → replaced by  Lizette Cabrera
  Elena Rybakina → replaced by  Océane Dodin
  Clara Tauson → replaced by  Zarina Diyas
  Ajla Tomljanović → replaced by  Wang Xinyu
  Venus Williams → replaced by  Giulia Gatto-Monticone
  Wang Qiang → replaced by  Anastasia Gasanova
  Zheng Saisai → replaced by  Leonie Küng

Retirements
  Kristie Ahn

WTA doubles main-draw entrants

Seeds

1 Rankings are as of 31 May 2021.

Other entrants
The following pairs received wildcards into the doubles main draw:
  Katie Boulter /  Jodie Burrage
  Naomi Broady /  Harriet Dart

The following pair received entry using a protected ranking:
  Christina McHale /  CoCo Vandeweghe

The following pair received entry as an alternate:
  Marie Bouzková /  Alicja Rosolska

Withdrawals
Before the tournament
  Lauren Davis /  Caty McNally → replaced by  Marie Bouzková /  Alicja Rosolska
  Sharon Fichman /  Giuliana Olmos → replaced by  Elixane Lechemia /  Ingrid Neel
  Vivian Heisen /  Květa Peschke → replaced by  Tara Moore /  Eden Silva
  Dalila Jakupović /  Yana Sizikova → replaced by  Sarah Beth Grey /  Emily Webley-Smith
  Ellen Perez /  Danielle Collins → replaced by  Naiktha Bains /  Samantha Murray Sharan
  Xu Yifan /  Zhang Shuai → replaced by  Ellen Perez /  Zhang Shuai

During the tournament
  Kaitlyn Christian /  Nao Hibino
  Johanna Konta /  Donna Vekić

References

External links
 Website

2021 WTA Tour
2021 ATP Challenger Tour
2021
2021 in English tennis
June 2021 sports events in the United Kingdom
2021 Nottingham Open
 in English women's sport